Megan Kate Gale (born 7 August 1975) is an Australian model and actress. Born in Perth, Western Australia, Gale won a model contest when she was 18 in her home town. In 1999 she was cast in a series of commercials for the Italian  branch of telecommunications company Vodafone. This led to wide exposure in both Italy and her homeland Australia, and she appeared in those advertising until 2006. Gale has also appeared in Italian movies and television shows, and as an actress, Gale recently played "Fatma" in Russell Crowe's The Water Diviner (2014) and "Valkyrie" in George Miller's Mad Max: Fury Road (2015).

In 2005 Gale became the national ambassador for "Kids Help Line" and in 2009 she was appointed the first official "National Ambassador" for "The Red Cross".

Early life 
Born in Parmelia, Western Australia, Gale's father is English and her mother is part Maori. She is the youngest of three children with two older brothers.

Career

Modelling 
Gale won a modelling competition in Perth at 18. After several years of modelling, Gale rose to fame when in 1999 was cast to appear in a series of advertisements for an Italian telecommunication company, Omnitel (now Vodafone Italy); she appeared in the company's advertising until 2006. She was also retained by the Australian Tourist Commission in 2003 as 'their face of Australia in Italy'. Gale has graced the covers of Australian Marie Claire, Grazia, Gioia, Italian and Australian GQ,  Italian Maxim, Australian InStyle and featured in editorials for Australian Cosmopolitan and Vogue Italia.
 
Gale has modeled for Italian fashion houses including Gianfranco Ferré, Genny, Gai Mattiolo and runway work for Mariella Burani and Angelo Marani at Milan Fashion Week. Gale also favours many Australian designers, such as Colette Dinnigan, Kirrily Johnston, Lisa Ho, Willow and Alex Perry. In 2006, she was the fashion commentator for the Australian television awards, the Logies.

In January 2008, Gale announced her retirement from runway modelling after 15 years and walked the catwalk for the last time just weeks later at a David Jones winter collection launch in Sydney. Her final outfit was the Wonder Woman outfit she was to wear in the still-shelved film Justice League of America. In March 2011, Gale returned to the runway and closed Alex Perry's 2011 Melbourne Fashion Festival show.

August 2011 marked Gale's 10th anniversary with department store David Jones, the longest held fashion contract in Australia.
That same month, Gale became an ambassador for L'Oréal Paris, joining Beyoncé, Jennifer Lopez and Gwen Stefani. Gale appeared in a L'Oréal shampoo commercial in Australia, New Zealand and Italy.

Acting 
Megan Gale has appeared in the Italian movies Vacanze di Natale 2000, Body Guards as herself in both movies, and in Stregati dalla luna (Bewitched by the Moon in Italian) as "Vivianna". She also had a cameo part in the 2005 movie Stealth where she played Dr. Orbit's secretary. In January 2008, it was announced that she had been offered the part of Wonder Woman in the upcoming George Miller movie version of Justice League of America, before the project was put on hold and eventually cancelled. In August 2009, Gale completed filming a role in her first Australian feature film, the romantic comedy I Love You Too, where she played Italian supermodel "Francesca Moretti". Gale also appeared in 2014 Russell Crowe's drama film The Water Diviner in the role of "Fatma", and in 2015 Miller's post-apocalyptic action film Mad Max: Fury Road in the role of "Valkyrie".

Swimwear range 
In 2010, Gale launched a swimwear label, "Isola". The line is carried at department stores, including "David Jones".

Television 
In 2005, Gale became a guest reporter for Nine Network travel show Getaway from October 2005 to June 2006. She also worked with Mike Munro as co-host of the nine-episode Australian documentary TV show What a Year, which first aired on the Nine Network on 2 October 2006. Gale also appeared briefly on Australia's Next Top Model, Cycle 4 in episode 4. She also appeared in cycle 6 (2010), in which the girls of that cycle were featured in Isola's first fashion show.

Gale also became the National Ambassador for Kids Help Line in February 2005. In 2009, she was appointed the first official National Ambassador for The Red Cross.

In early 2011 Gale became the new host of Project Runway Australia where she would also serve as judge and executive producer of the design-based reality show. The new season premiered on 4 July 2011 on Arena TV. In 2016, Gale became a permanent judge on Australia's Next Top Model.

Personal life 
In January 2011, Gale began a relationship with Richmond footballer Shaun Hampson. On 20 July 2017, the couple announced their engagement. They have two children, a son and a daughter.

Filmography

References

External links 

 
 
 
 

1975 births
Living people
Female models from Western Australia
Models from Perth, Western Australia
Australian film actresses
Australian television actresses
People educated at John Curtin College of the Arts
Actresses from Perth, Western Australia
Australian people of English descent
Australian people of Māori descent